Viejas Valley is a valley located in eastern San Diego County, California.

Geography

See also

Viejas Group of Capitan Grande Band of Mission Indians

References

Valleys of San Diego County, California
Cuyamaca Mountains
East County (San Diego County)